5-MBPB (also known as 5-MPBP and 5-MABB) is an amphetamine derivative which is structurally related to MDMA and has been sold as a designer drug. It can be described as the benzofuran-5-yl analogue of MBDB or the butanamine homologue of 5-MAPB, and is also a structural isomer of 5-EAPB and 6-EAPB. Anecdotal reports suggest this compound has been sold as a designer drug in various European countries since early 2015, but the first definitive identification was made in December 2015 by a forensic laboratory in Slovenia.

5-MBPB is similar in structure to compounds such as 5-APB which are claimed to be agonists of the 5-HT2C receptor.

References

Substituted amphetamines
5-Benzofuranethanamines
Designer drugs
Entactogens and empathogens